The Best of Apocalypse is an album by the Brazilian rock band Apocalypse.
 
After Apocalypse performed at Planeta Atlântida, the most important pop music festival in the south of Brazil the Atração Fonográfica record label invite Apocalypse to release a compilation. Apocalypse, with the permission of Musea Records, took the best of their three works released by the French label and the CD was released on the Brazilian market.

Track listing
 Levando A Vida (short version) – 4:21
 Mesmo Que Não Haja Nada – 5:01
 A Paz Da Solidão – 3:21
 Jamais Retornarei – 6:22
 Sozinho, Perdido Dentro De Mim – 3:58
 Magia – 5:53
 Limites De Vento – 7:46
 Chamando Por Ajuda – 6:18
 Corta – 6:10
 Em Apenas Um Segundo – 6:30
 Lágrimas – 5:43
 Do Outro Lado Da Vida – 9:54

Musicians
 Eloy Fritsch: Electronic keyboards, piano, Organ, Minimoog, vocals
 Ruy Fritsch: Electric and acoustic guitars, vocals
 Chico Fasoli: Drums, percussion, vocals
 Chico Casara: Lead Vocal, Bass guitar

References

1998 albums
Apocalypse (band) albums